The Pseudaminae is a subfamily of ray-finned fishes, one of two subfamilies of the family Apogonidae, the cardinalfishes. They are characterised by having large caniform teeth which are placed on the on dentary and premaxillae, by having the lateral line absent or incomplete, by having no scales or if scales are present they are cycloid. One species, Gymnapogon urospilotus, is notable for its larvae being rather large and fast-swimming.

Genera
Four genera make up the subfamily Pseudaminae:

 Gymnapogon Regan, 1905
 Paxton C. C. Baldwin & G. D. Johnson, 1999
 Pseudamia  Bleeker, 1865
 Pseudamiops J. L. B. Smith, 1954

References

 
Apogonidae